The Wants is the second studio album by Scottish indie rock band The Phantom Band, released on 18 October 2010 through Chemikal Underground Records.

Track listing
"A Glamour" - 6:25
"O" - 4:31
"Everybody Knows It's True - 4:17
"The None Of One" - 8:19
"Mr. Natural" - 5:22
"Come Away In The Dark" - 2:41
"Walls" - 4:37
"Into The Corn" - 6:27
"Goodnight Arrow" - 5:22

Personnel
Duncan Marquiss
Gerry Hart
Andy Wake
Rick Anthony
Damien Tonner
Greg Sinclair

References

The Phantom Band albums
2010 albums
Chemikal Underground albums